Throughout film history, the U.S. state of Oregon has been a popular shooting location for filmmakers due to its wide range of landscapes, as well as its proximity to California, specifically Hollywood. The first documented commercial film made in Oregon was a short silent film titled The Fisherman's Bride, shot in Astoria by the Selig Polyscope Company, and released in 1909. Another documentary short, Fast Mail, Northern Pacific Railroad, was shot in Portland in 1897.

Since then, numerous major motion pictures have been shot in the state, including F.W. Murnau's City Girl (1930), One Flew Over the Cuckoo's Nest (1975), Animal House (1978), Stand by Me (1986), Free Willy (1993), and Wild (2014). Portland—Oregon's largest city—has been a major shooting location for filmmakers, and has been featured prominently in the films of Gus Van Sant, namely Mala Noche (1985), Drugstore Cowboy (1989), My Own Private Idaho (1991), and Elephant (2003).

This list of films shot is organized first by region, and then chronologically by year. Some films may appear more than once if they were shot in more than one region.

Northeast

Southeast

Southwest

Northwest

Central

Coastal

Other
According to a list provided by the Oregon Film Council, the following films were shot in Oregon; however, specific locations and cities were not documented.

Notes

References

External links
Oregon Film, a catalogue of films shot in Oregon by the Oregon Governor's Office of Film & Television
The Oregon Film Museum, an online database of films shot in Oregon

 
Oregon
Films
Films